Greatest Hits is the first compilation album by Finnish singer-songwriter Anna Abreu, released in Finland by RCA on February 22, 2012. The album contains all of the singles released from Abreu's four previous studio albums (Anna Abreu, Now, Just a Pretty Face? and Rush) along with several album tracks that were favourites of Abreu's. The album was released in two formats: a CD only version containing eighteen tracks, or a 2-disc CD/DVD version which also includes Abreu's eight music videos and a documentary. The album would be Abreu's final release under her recording contract with RCA, as she moved to Warner Bros. Records later in 2012.

Commercial performance
Greatest Hits debuted and peaked at number eighteen on the Finnish Top 50 Albums Chart, Abreu's lowest chart position to date. To date it has sold around 5,000 copies.

Chart performance

Track listing

Promotion

In 2012, Abreu promoted her greatest hits album with the Over and Out Tour throughout Finland. Her Walking On Water Two show, which was a one-off held aboard the M/S Silja Europa in Turku was also used to promote the album.

Setlist

Tour dates

References

2012 greatest hits albums
Sony Music compilation albums
Anna Abreu albums